The 1980 Artistic Gymnastics World Cup was held in Toronto, Canada in 1980.

Medal winners

References

1980
Artistic Gymnastics World Cup
International gymnastics competitions hosted by Canada
1980 in Canadian sports